Bekenu may refer to:
Bekenu
Bekenu (state constituency), represented in the Sarawak State Legislative Assembly